Franz Harary (born July 18, 1962) is an American magician and inventor who has appeared on television shows such as the first episode of NBC's The World's Greatest Magic, on which Harary made the Space Shuttle appear to vanish.

While studying music at Eastern Michigan University and aspiring to be a singer and dancer on Broadway, Harary was designing illusions as a hobby. He began performing publicly after persuading the university's marching band leader to let him appear as part of the halftime show. Between 1982 and 1984, Harary's Odyssey In Illusion team designed and executed illusions for ballet troupes, ice revues, marching bands, and symphony orchestras. It was featured on ABC-TV's live telecast of the 1983 Thanksgiving Day parade in Detroit. At the end of 1983, Harary sent Michael Jackson a videotape of Odyssey In Illusions greatest hits and within a week was invited to perform as part of the Jacksons' "Victory Tour" in 1984. Harary made Jackson levitate and disappear on one side of the stage and reappear with his brothers on the other side. In 1990, a character in World Championship Wrestling called The Black Scorpion used magic in efforts to anger the popular Sting. Wrestling websites claim Harary was the masked man performing the magic.

Among other music acts he has designed illusions for are N*SYNC, Cher, Snoop Dogg, Tupac Shakur, Tone Loc, Styx, Dr. Dre, Usher, Boyz II Men, Queen Latifah, Hammer, Tina Turner, Reba McEntire and Missy Elliott.

In 1996 Harary created all the magic segments for the Broadway production Ragtime, in which Houdini was one of its main characters.

Harary's own touring show is especially popular in Asia and the Far East. In the U.S. he is most often seen in Atlantic City.

Franz Harary recently appeared as a technical advisor for the Magic Challenges during seasons 3 and 5 of America's Best Dance Crew.

Notable Television Appearances 

In 2010, Franz Harary was the principal judge in a magical TV series called  India's Magic Star, which is being telecast on the Indian channel Star One. In addition to acting as judge and "magic guru," Harary designed over 90 original effects that were performed by him as well as the other magicians on the show. The program is currently being shown in the UK.

References

External links
 
 

1962 births
Living people
People from Ann Arbor, Michigan
American magicians
Magic consultants
Academy of Magical Arts Performing Fellowship winners
Academy of Magical Arts Special Fellowship winners